Linda Valori (born 3 September 1978 in San Benedetto del Tronto, Province of Ascoli Piceno) is an Italian singer.

In 2004, she won third place at the Sanremo festival, with the song "Aria, sole, terra e mare", for which she composed the lyrics herself. She won the Golden Stag Festival's trophy in 2005.

She was born to an Italian father and Romanian mother.

Discography
 La forma delle nuvole (2005)
 Tutti quelli (2010)
 Days Like This (2013)

References

1978 births
Living people
People from San Benedetto del Tronto
Italian pop singers
Italian people of Romanian descent
21st-century Italian singers
Golden Stag winners